KZQM (104.9 FM) is a radio station operating in Sequim, Washington.

Monikered as “Rocks Classic Hits”, Z-104.9 plays a format of top hits from the 1960s-1980s.

KZQM is owned and operated by Radio Pacific, Inc. Its sister stations are KONP and KSTI based in neighboring Port Angeles.

References

External links
Radio Pacific My Clallam County

ZQM
Classic hits radio stations in the United States